Sunshine is an album by American girl group the Emotions, released in November 1977 by Stax Records. The album reached No. 39 on the Billboard Top Soul Albums chart.

Critical reception

Andrew Hamilton of Allmusic gave a 3 out of 5 stars rating saying "Sunshine has some excellent cuts and some that don't quite fit the Chicagoans' style." John Storm Roberts of High Fidelity wrote "Fantasy Records has begun reissuing some of the old Stax catalog, and "Sunshine" is part of that venture-a bunch of singles backed by Stax house musicians, none of them previously released on albums.
The result is pure and amazingly cohesive joy. Without once departing from the classic framework of female group rhythm & blues, "Sunshine" is as rich and varied as anything I've heard in months. With only one exception, Any Way You Look at It, every number positively drips with tasty touches in arrangement, singing. and playing." With a 3.5 out of 5 stars rating John Shearlaw of Record Mirror exclaimed "Old Emotions, new Emotions-they're just as good."

Covers
The Emotions covered Bill Withers' "Ain't No Sunshine" and Carla Thomas' "Gee Whiz (Look at His Eyes)" upon the album.

Singles
The song "Shouting Out Love" peaked at No. 31 on the Billboard Hot Soul Songs chart.

Track listing

Personnel
The Emotions
Sheila Hutchinson - vocals
Theresa Davis - vocals
Wanda Hutchinson - vocals
with:
Bobby Manuel, Michael Toles - guitar
Donald "Duck" Dunn, Earl Thomas - bass
Lester Snell, Marvell Thomas, Ronnie Williams - keyboards
Al Jackson Jr., Willie Hall - drums
The Memphis Horns - brass
The Detroit Strings - strings
The Memphis Symphony - orchestra
Dale Warren, James Mitchell, Johnny Allen - arrangements

References

1977 albums
The Emotions albums
Albums produced by Jim Stewart (record producer)
Albums produced by Al Bell
Albums produced by Marvell Thomas
Stax Records albums